Muthuramalinga Sethupathi II (1841–1873) was the zamindar of Ramnad estate from 1862 to 1873. He was adopted by his aunt Parvatha Vardhani Ammal Nachiyar, the Rani of Ramnad. He was a patron of arts and music.

Muthuramalinga Sethupathi married Muthathal Nachiyar. The couple had a son, Bhaskara Sethupathi.

References 

 

1841 births
1873 deaths
People from Tamil Nadu
People from British India